Cerrillos is a department of Salta Province, Argentina, located near Salta city. Its capital is the town of Cerrillos.

Geography 
Localities and places:
 Cerrillos
 La Merced 
 San Agustín
 Sumalao
 Villa Los Álamos

See also 
Tren a las Nubes
Salta–Antofagasta railway

References

External links 

 Cerrillos Department on Salta Province website

Departments of Salta Province